Yarijan-e Sofla, also known as Yarijan-e Pain, may refer to:
 Yarijan-e Sofla, Kermanshah
 Yarijan-e Sofla, West Azerbaijan